Fitzroy is a coastal suburb of New Plymouth, in the western North Island of New Zealand. It is located to the north-east of the city centre.

Holy Trinity Church in Henui Street is listed as a Category I structure with Heritage New Zealand.

Demographics

Fitzroy-Glen Avon had a population of 3,504 at the 2018 New Zealand census, an increase of 234 people (7.2%) since the 2013 census, and an increase of 624 people (21.7%) since the 2006 census. There were 1,383 households, comprising 1,686 males and 1,818 females, giving a sex ratio of 0.93 males per female. The median age was 41.4 years (compared with 37.4 years nationally), with 729 people (20.8%) aged under 15 years, 546 (15.6%) aged 15 to 29, 1,611 (46.0%) aged 30 to 64, and 621 (17.7%) aged 65 or older.

Ethnicities were 89.0% European/Pākehā, 15.0% Māori, 2.6% Pacific peoples, 5.0% Asian, and 2.0% other ethnicities. People may identify with more than one ethnicity.

The percentage of people born overseas was 16.3, compared with 27.1% nationally.

Although some people chose not to answer the census's question about religious affiliation, 54.2% had no religion, 33.6% were Christian, 0.3% had Māori religious beliefs, 0.3% were Hindu, 1.1% were Muslim, 0.5% were Buddhist and 1.6% had other religions.

Of those at least 15 years old, 492 (17.7%) people had a bachelor's or higher degree, and 537 (19.4%) people had no formal qualifications. The median income was $32,500, compared with $31,800 nationally. 528 people (19.0%) earned over $70,000 compared to 17.2% nationally. The employment status of those at least 15 was that 1,374 (49.5%) people were employed full-time, 471 (17.0%) were part-time, and 84 (3.0%) were unemployed.

Education
Fitzroy School is a coeducational contributing primary (years 1–6) school with a roll of  students as of  The school celebrated its 125th jubilee in 2007.

St John Bosco School is a coeducational contributing primary (years 1–6) school with a roll of  students as of  It is a state integrated Catholic school, established in 1942.

Notes

External links
 Sacred Heart Girls College website
 St John Bosco School website 

Suburbs of New Plymouth